Tina Khan (25 May 1966 – 20 January 1989) was a Bangladeshi film actress and producer. She appeared in about 25 films. She was conferred special award posthumously on 13th National Film Awards.

Biography
Khan was born on 25 May 1966 in Chuadanga.  Her real name was Firoza Rahman Tina. She was married to Moazzem Hossain when she was in class nine.

After coming to Dhaka Khan joined the theatre group of Abdullah Al Mamun.  Later, she began to act in films. She is known for a film titled Princess Tina Khan which was released in 1985.  She produced that film too. The film was based on lives of Jatra artists.

Khan died in a road accident on 20 January 1989. She was conferred a special award posthumously in the 13th National Film Awards.

Selected filmography
 Bimanbala 
 Rajanigandha 
 Mou Chor 
 Ayna Bibir Pala 
 Lagam 
 Dui Jibon 
 Eri Nam Prem 
 Ekai Eksho 
 Princess Tina Khan

References

External links

1966 births
Bangladeshi film actresses
Recipients of the National Film Awards (Bangladesh)
1989 deaths
Bangladeshi film producers
People from Chuadanga District
Bangladeshi women film producers
Road incident deaths in Bangladesh